Aunt Hilda! (French: Tante Hilda !; also known as Auntie Hilda in the United States) is a 2013 animated French film directed by Benoît Chieux and Jacques-Rémy Girerd.

Plot
The film is set in Beaumont-les-Vignes, a fictional town in south-eastern France in the near future. Two sisters, Hilda and Dolores, followed diametrically opposite course. Hilda, a young redhead with a lanky silhouette, is a fierce environmentalist: she goes around on a bicycle, is always concerned about the preservation of the environment and gathered a plant museum where she keeps all kinds of plants. Dolores, on the other side, became the ruthless CEO of a multinational food company seeking profits in the short term. Thanks to the GMO technology that involves genetically modifying plants, Dolores has developed a new cereal called Attilem, a kind of giant artichoke with tentacles. This new product, able to grow with very little water and no fertilizer, should bring her astronomical profits. She says it could even solve the problem of hunger in the world and replace oil as a new source of energy. But soon the Attilem plants begin to grow too fast, out of control, and invade the world. Dolores design then a pesticide and proposes to sell to governments to fight against the disaster that her company has provoked. Aunt Hilda does not agree and began to work to save the world her way, but the game is not over.

Cast

 Sabine Azéma as Aunt Hilda
 Josiane Balasko as Dolorès
 François Morel as Ike
 Bruno Lochet as Turner
 Serguei Vladimirov as Michael Aldashin
 Gilles Détroit as The President
 Bernard Bouillon as Julio Attilio
 Christian Taponard as Johnson
 Line Wiblé as Marie
 Jean-Pierre Yvars as Pierre

Accolades

References

External links

2013 films
2010s French animated films
Folimage films
Films directed by Jacques-Rémy Girerd
2010s French films